Narcissus lusitanicus is a species of the genus Narcissus (daffodils) in the family Amaryllidaceae. It is classified in Section Ganymedes. It is native to Portugal.

Taxonomy
Opinions vary as the status of this taxon. It was raised to species rank in 2000 by  Alvarez and Fernandez Casas, and is accepted by The Plant List and the World Checklist, but the Royal Horticultural Society still consider it a be the subspecies (see Synonyms). Genetic studies support species rank.

References

lusitanicus
Garden plants
Flora of North Africa
Plants described in 1989